Stasiūnai is a village in Kėdainiai district municipality, in Kaunas County, in central Lithuania. It is located by the Smilgaitis river and Keleriškiai pond, nearby Josvainiai forest. According to the 2011 census, the village has a population of 19 people. There is a "Ąžuolotas" forestry in the village.

Demography

References

Villages in Kaunas County
Kėdainiai District Municipality